The Good Mother or goodmother or variant, may refer to:

The Good Mother (1988 film), US, based on a novel by Sue Miller
Glass House: The Good Mother, a 2006 film
 "Good Mother", a 1994 song by Jann Arden in the album Living Under June

See also

 "maia", the taxonomic term deriving from "good mother", see List of commonly used taxonomic affixes
 Good Wife, Wise Mother aka Wise Wife, Good Mother
 Godmother (disambiguation)
 Goodfather (disambiguation)
 
 
 
 
 Mother (disambiguation)
 Good (disambiguation)